Ternate-Varano Borghi railway station is a railway station in the comune of Ternate, in the Italian region of Lombardy. It is an intermediate stop on the standard gauge Luino–Milan line of Rete Ferroviaria Italiana.

Services 
 the following services stop at Ternate-Varano Borghi:

References

External links 
 
 Ternate-Varano Borghi – RFI

Buildings and structures in the Province of Varese
Railway stations in Lombardy